Wheeler Airport  is a private use airport in Starke County, Indiana, United States. It is located six nautical miles (11 km) south of the central business district of Knox, Indiana, and was previously a public use airport.

Facilities and aircraft 
Wheeler Airport covers an area of 15 acres (6 ha) at an elevation of 720 feet (219 m) above mean sea level. It has one runway designated 8/26 with a turf surface measuring 2,600 by 200 feet (792 x 61 m).

For the 12-month period ending November 30, 1994, the airport had 7,284 aircraft operations, an average of 19 per day: 97% general aviation and 3% air taxi. At that time there were five aircraft based at this airport: four single-engine and one ultralight.

See also 
 List of airports in Indiana

References

External links 
 Aerial image as of April 1998 from USGS The National Map
 

Airports in Indiana
Transportation buildings and structures in Starke County, Indiana